The Ulsterman was a short lived tri-weekly nationalist four page newspaper based in Belfast in Ireland, UK.

First published on 17 November 1852 with Denis Holland, former editor of The Northern Whig as proprietor and editor. The paper closed in 1859 a year after Holland started concentrating on the weekly Irishman.

References

Publications established in 1852
Newspapers published in Ireland
Defunct newspapers published in Ireland
1852 establishments in Ireland